Armindo Maia  is an East Timorese politician and academic, and a member of the Fretilin political party. He is the incumbent Minister of Education, Youth and Sport, serving since June 2020 in the VIII Constitutional Government of East Timor led by Prime Minister Taur Matan Ruak.

Between 2001 and 2006, he held the same position in governments led by UN administrator Sérgio Vieira de Mello and Prime Minister Mari Alkatiri, respectively.

Early life and career
Maia has a master's degree in Philosophy from Massey University in Palmerston North, New Zealand. He was a pioneering staff member of the Universitas Timor Timur (UnTim), East Timor's first university, from when it was founded in 1986. By 1997, he was UnTim's Vice Rector for Academic Affairs.

During the Indonesian occupation of East Timor that lasted until 1999, Maia was involved in a number of academic and political activities internationally in support of East Timor's independence movement. On a visit to the US in the late-1990s, he interacted with prominent East Timorese from the diaspora, including José Ramos-Horta and João Carrascalão. Following his return, the Indonesian regime therefore imposed restrictions on his freedom.

On the establishment in November 2000 of UnTim's successor, the National University of East Timor (UNTL), Maia took office as its first Rector.

Political and further career
On 30 September 2001, Maia, who was not then a member of a political party, was appointed as the Minister of Education, Culture and Youth in East Timor's II UNTAET Transitional Government established by Sérgio Vieira de Mello, the United Nations administrator for East Timor.

Maia retained that post, with added responsibility for Sports, in the I Constitutional Government of East Timor under Prime Minister Mari Alkatiri, which took office on 20 May 2002. On 14 July 2006, the IConstitutional Government was replaced by the II Constitutional Government, and Maia was succeeded as Minister by Rosária Corte-Real.

Maia then returned to UNTL, as a Senior Lecturer. From July 2012, he was a PhD candidate at the State, Society and Governance in Melanesia Program in the ANU College of Asia and the Pacific in Canberra, Australia.

On 24 June 2020, following a change in the governing coalition, and the admission of Fretilin to the VIII Constitutional Government, Maia was sworn in for a further term as Minister of Education, Youth and Sport.

Since being reappointed as Minister, Maia has worked on improving East Timor's school education system. In August 2020, he announced that he had held discussions for the implementation of sports in schools, and said that a program would be included in the Ministry's proposal for the next State budget. In November 2020, he confirmed that throughout 2021, significant construction and rehabilitation would be carried out at 221 schools and to 1,500 classrooms. On International Literacy Day 2021, he called on parents to send their children to school: "Education, as well as learning, is ageless."

In August 2022, Maia admitted publicly that only 28% of children had access to kindergarten in East Timor. He noted that this was due to an inadequate budget allocation of only 2% of the Ministry's funds. He urged the relevant government entities to cooperate with the Ministry in increasing the allocation. Later that month, a Ministry team led by Maia concluded regional and national consultations on 'Transforming Education' that had been aimed at formulating plans for making education in East Timor more equitable and improving its quality. The consultations were also intended to inform the creation of a National Statement of Commitment that would be presented to a United Nations summit in September 2022. According to Maia:

On International Literacy Day 2022, Maia confirmed that the government was committed to the combatting of illiteracy. In East Timor, the literacy rate had been increasing rapidly; Maia observed that the government was collaborating with UNESCO and had been cooperating with the government of Cuba in implementing programs for its further increase.

In November 2022, Maia stated that the Ministry would intensify cooperation with Portugal on two projects in the field of education and training, and in partnership with other Portuguese-speaking countries to support teacher training. In January 2023, Maia announced that the government would change the law to mandate the use of the Portuguese language during lessons in East Timorese schools. Commentators noted that the government and the Ministry believed that potential economic benefits from other Portuguese-speaking countries were an incentive for such a measure.

The protocol relating to one of the cooperation projects with Portugual was signed by Maia and his Portuguese counterpart in Dili in March 2023.

Meanwhile, in December 2022, Maia signed a tripartite Memorandum of Understanding (MoU) between the World Food Program (WFP), the Ministry, and the Ministry of State Administration, for the continuation and expansion of East Timor's National School Feeding Programme, which had been managed by the Ministry since 2011 after being introduced to East Timor by the WFP in 2005.

The following month, on International Day of Education 2023, Maia emphasised the importance of education as a pillar of development in East Timor:

He added that investment in education should be comprehensive, and include the improvement of infrastructure, training and curriculum, along with educational organizations and classroom management.

Honours
  2011: Insignia of the Order of Timor-Leste.

References

External links 

Fretilin politicians
Government ministers of East Timor
Living people
Year of birth missing (living people)

21st-century East Timorese politicians